This is a list of Billboard magazine's Top Hot 100 songs of 1996.

See also
1996 in music
List of Billboard Hot 100 number-one singles of 1996
List of Billboard Hot 100 top-ten singles in 1996

References

1996 record charts
Billboard charts